The 2001 Batang Red Bull Thunder season was the 2nd season of the franchise in the Philippine Basketball Association (PBA).

Draft picks

Transactions

Championship
In only their second year of participation and fifth conference so far, the Batang Red Bull Thunder have already won a PBA title. Behind Best Import Antonio Lang, the Thunder upset the highly favored San Miguel Beermen, winners of five of the last six conferences, with a 4-2 series victory in the Commissioner's Cup finals. Red Bull coach Yeng Guiao won his third championship as a head coach and his first since 1993.

Roster

 Team Manager: Tony Chua

Elimination round

Games won

References

Barako Bull Energy Boosters seasons